The 50th World Rowing Junior Championships were the 50th edition and were held from 24 to 28 August 2016 at the Willem-Alexander Baan in Rotterdam, Netherlands in conjunction with the World Rowing Championships and the World Rowing U23 Championships.

Medal summary

Men's events

Women's events

See also
 Rowing at the 2016 Summer Olympics
 2016 World Rowing Championships
 2016 World Rowing U23 Championships

References

External links
Official website
WorldRowing website

2016
Junior
International sports competitions hosted by the Netherlands
Sports competitions in Rotterdam
2016 in Dutch sport
2016 in rowing
August 2016 sports events in Europe